Kazakhstan–South Korea relations are the international relations between Kazakhstan and the South Korea.

Diplomatic relations between the two countries were established on January 28, 1992, shortly after Kazakhstan's independence. Bilateral relations have grown steadily since that time. Cooperation between the two nations has grown in political, economic, and educational spheres. The presence of 100,000 ethnic Koreans living in Kazakhstan (known as Koryo-saram) creates an additional link between the two countries.

History
South Korea and Kazakhstan formally established diplomatic relations in January 1992. Soon thereafter South Korea opened its embassy in Almaty, and in 1996 Kazakhstan opened its embassy in Seoul.

Kazakhstani president Nursultan Nazarbayev has made five official visits to South Korea, in 1995, 2003, 2010, 2012, 2016. In 2004, South Korean president Roh Moo Hyun visited Kazakhstan. His successor, Lee Myung-bak, visited Kazakhstan in 2009. President Park Geun-hye visited Kazakhstan in 2014 where she and President Nazarbayev agreed to strengthen economic and investment cooperation and technology exchange. President Moon Jae-In visited Kazakhstan in 2019. 

Kazakhstan President Kassym-Jomart Tokayev paid a state visit to S. Korea on 16-17 of August, 2021, and has become first foreign leader to visit South Korea amid pandemic. Low-level officials, including ministers and mayors, make regular visits between the two countries.

Economic relations

Since independence, South Korea and Kazakhstan have witnessed deepening economics ties, as Kazakhstan has become South Korea's most important trading partner in Central Asia. Korean business have invested more than $7 billion in Kazakhstan, and South Korean investors have assets in more than 500 companies in Kazakhstan. In 2008, Kookmin Bank, one of South Korea's largest banks, purchased a 30% stake in Kazakhstan's CenterCredit Bank for about $634 million.

South Korea's major exports to Kazakhstan include automobiles, televisions, and other electronics. Kazakh exports primarily raw materials, including copper and zinc, to South Korea.

Korean companies are also involved in Kazakhstan's oil industry. The Korean Consortium of the Caspian Oil Project, which is led by the Korea National Oil Company and includes SK Corporation, LG International, Samsung, and Daesung Industrial, is involved in the development of the Zhambyl oil field, located in the Caspian Sea. Under the agreement, the consortium will own 27% of drilling rights, with the option to purchase up to 50% of the rights, depending on what is found after further exploration. The field is estimated to hold 1 billion barrels of crude oil.

In May 2009 the two countries signed an agreement for Korean investments in Kazakhstan's energy and technology sectors totaling over $5 billion. The agreement includes a $2.5 billion investment by South Korean companies in a new power plant in southern Kazakhstan. The two companies, Korea Electric Power Corporation and Samsung C&T will own 65% of the plant, which is scheduled for completion by 2014.

South Korean President Park Geun-hye expressed support for the economic development Kazakhstan 2050 Strategy on a 2014 visit to Kazakhstan.

As of 2020, Kazakhstan is South Korea's second largest partner in emerging Europe and Central Asia, with trade reaching $5.9 billion. South Korea imported $1 billion worth of goods and resources from Kazakhstan, and South Korean investment in Kazakhstan and Uzbekistan exceeded $7 billion.

In November 2020, the South Korean embassy in Astana organized a webinar looking at Kazakhstan's approach to voluntary disposing of the 1410 warheads it inherited from the Soviet Union. The two countries also had productive talks during the 13th Central Asia-South Korea Cooperation Forum in Seoul, in which they discussed the consequences and opportunities for economic cooperation in the context of the COVID-19 pandemic, as well as the removal of remaining barriers to trade and improving product quality and competitiveness.

Cultural/educational relations
In 2005 the Association for Kazakhstan Studies in Korea (AKSK) was founded in response to South Korean president Roh's visit to Kazakhstan. The association aims to improve bilateral relations between the two countries as well as improve academic study of the different ethnicities in Kazakhstan.

Koryo-saram 
In the late 1930s thousands of Koreans in the Soviet Union were deported to Central Asia, supposedly to prevent further Japanese espionage. These people are now known as Koryo-sarams. It is estimated that 100,000 ethnic Koreans still live in the territory of Kazakhstan. The presence of these ethnic Koreans helps to strengthen ties between the two countries.

Ambassadors of Korea in Kazakhstan 
 (embassy since 1992–1996)
 Kim Chang Geun 김창근 1993.11
 Lee Young Min 이영민 1996.10
 Choi Seung Ho 최승호 1999.11
 Tae Suk Won 태석원 2002.08
 Kim Il Soo 김일수 2005.09
 Lee Byung Hwa 이병화 2009.03
 Baek Joo Hyun 백주현 2012.04
 Cho Young Cheon 조용천 2015.10
Kim Dae Sik 김대식 2017.04
 Goo Hung Suk 구 홍석 2020.07

References

External links 
 Embassy of Kazakhstan in South Korea
 Kazakhstan-South Korean relations Kazakhstan Ministry of Foreign Affairs
 Kazakhstan-South Korean relations South Korean Ministry of Foreign Affairs
 Embassy of South Korea in Kazakhstan

 
Korea, South
Bilateral relations of South Korea